"Scream Aim Fire" is a song by Welsh heavy metal band Bullet for My Valentine. The first single from their second album, Scream Aim Fire, the song was released on the American iTunes store on 18 December 2007, and has also been released on the band's MySpace profile. Featured in the video games Guitar Hero World Tour and non-US versions of Guitar Hero Modern Hits, it is the band's highest charting single worldwide. It is also available as downloadable content in the video game Rock Band 3. A live version of the song recorded at BBC Radio 1's Live Lounge show was included as a bonus track on deluxe editions of the band's 4th studio album Temper Temper.

Music video
The music video shows the band performing in a warehouse. Images of war are displayed on large screens throughout the video, which are parallel to the band. The video is purely band performance, cross cut between close ups of singer Matt Tuck, and the performance of the rest of the band. The lyrics of the song are about "going to war" as Matt Tuck describes during live shows. For example, they scream "over the top" several times in the song, a reference to World War I trench warfare.  The video was directed by Iranian music video director, Tony Petrossian.

Release history

Charts

Track listing
CD Single
 "Scream Aim Fire" - 4:26
CD & UK Digital edition
 "Scream Aim Fire" – 4:26
 "Forever and Always" (acoustic) – 4:19
Red cover vinyl
<li>"Scream Aim Fire" – 4:26
<li>"Creeping Death" (Metallica cover) – 6:40
White cover vinyl
<li>"Scream Aim Fire" – 4:26
<li>"Crazy Train" (Ozzy Osbourne cover) – 4:51

Personnel
Matthew "Matt" Tuck - lead vocals, rhythm guitar
Michael "Padge" Paget - lead guitar, backing vocals
Jason "Jay" James - bass guitar, backing vocals
Michael "Moose" Thomas - drums

See also
List of anti-war songs

References

External links
 Official Music Video

2007 singles
Bullet for My Valentine songs
Music videos directed by Tony Petrossian
Songs written by Matthew Tuck
Songs written by Michael Paget
Songs written by Jason James (musician)
2007 songs
Jive Records singles
Sony BMG singles